Doug Nolan (born January 5, 1976 in Quincy, Massachusetts) is an American former professional ice hockey defenseman. He was formerly on the collegiate coaching staff at Wentworth Institute of Technology.

Playing career
Nolan was drafted 282nd overall by the Toronto Maple Leafs in the 1994 NHL Entry Draft, but never managed to play in the NHL. Nolan spent most of his career in the minor leagues of North American hockey, most notably playing with the Manchester Monarchs of the American Hockey League for five seasons before opting to pursue a European career.

Nolan joined Graz 99ers of the Austrian Hockey League in 2007. After one season he then moved on to HC Dinamo Minsk in the newly formed Kontinental Hockey League. He left Minsk after only 12 games on November 27, 2008 and moved to try out with Finnish club, Lukko Rauma. His trial with Lukko ended unsuccessfully and moved further to Frankfurt Lions without making an appearance before he left on January 9, 2009, to Austrian club the, Vienna Capitals.

Career statistics

References

External links

1976 births
HK Acroni Jesenice players
American men's ice hockey defensemen
Bridgeport Sound Tigers players
Cincinnati Mighty Ducks players
Dayton Bombers players
HC Dinamo Minsk players
Graz 99ers players
Hamilton Bulldogs (AHL) players
Living people
Lukko players
Manchester Monarchs (AHL) players
Ice hockey players from Massachusetts
Providence Bruins players
Reading Royals players
Toronto Maple Leafs draft picks
UMass Lowell River Hawks men's ice hockey players
Vienna Capitals players